Top Pops is a former British weekly pop music newspaper. It was founded as a monthly publication by Woodrow Wyatt in May 1967, becoming fortnightly in November 1967. On 25 May 1968, editor Colin Bostock-Smith began compiling a singles sales chart using a telephone sample of approximately twelve W H Smith & Son stores – the first single to reach number one on the Top Pops chart was "Young Girl" by Gary Puckett & The Union Gap. The charts and paper were published weekly with effect from 22 June 1968. On 20 September 1969 the paper was rebranded Top Pops & Music Now, and subsequently became Music Now from 21 March 1970 – at this point the chart was sampling between 30 and 40 stores. From 27 February 1971 the chart was no longer published and in May 1971 the newspaper ceased publication. During the publication of the chart, 55 different singles reached number one.  The only one to be knocked off number one and then regain the top spot was "Mony Mony" by Tommy James and the Shondells.  The final chart-topper was "My Sweet Lord" by George Harrison.

From the advent of charts in the UK until 1969 several magazines and newspapers published their own charts, and there was no one "official" singles chart. In February 1969, however, Record Retailer and the BBC jointly commissioned the British Market Research Bureau (BMRB) to compile an official chart. The Record Retailer chart is now considered by the Official Charts Company, the current compilers of the UK Singles Chart, to be the canonical source for number-one singles for the earlier part of the 1960s. Charts compiled by Top Pops had fifteen number-one singles that did not reach the top spot in the Record Retailer chart; in comparison, a total of nine Top Pops number-ones did not top the rival New Musical Express chart. Seven Top Pops number ones did not top either of the other publications' charts.  Edwin Hawkins Singers' "Oh Happy Day", Robin Gibb's "Saved by the Bell",  Bee Gees' "Don't Forget to Remember", and The Tremeloes' "(Call Me) Number One" all peaked at number two in both charts, Herman's Hermits' "My Sentimental Friend"  and Don Fardon's "Indian Reservation"  placed with one number two and one number three in each chart, and Stevie Wonder's "My Cherie Amour" reached fourth and third spot in the two charts. Fardon's "Indian Reservation," however, also made number one on the Melody Maker chart, so if that publication's number ones are factored in, Top PopsMusic Nows unique number ones total the six from 1969.

Number-one singles

Notes

References
Footnotes

Sources

Top Pops